Instinctual is a 1988 single by British dance trio Imagination. The single went to number one on the dance charts for one week and was the most successful of six entries on the chart. "Instinctual" charted at number sixty-two on the UK chart, however unlike previous chart entries by Imagination, the single did not place on the soul singles chart.

Chart performance

References

1988 singles
Imagination (band) songs
1988 songs
RCA Records singles